Ambehta is a town and a nagar panchayat in the Saharanpur district in the state of Uttar Pradesh, India.

Demographics
 India census, Ambehta had a population of 15,739. Males constitute 51.75% of the population and females 48.24%. Ambehta has an average literacy rate of 62.27%, lower than the national average of 74.04%; with 69.75% of the males and 54.25% of females literate. 16.46% of the population is under 6 years of age.

Notable residents
 Abidullah Ghazi, a prominent Muslim author and scholar
 Khalil Ahmad Anbahtawi Saharanpuri, Islamic scholar

References

Cities and towns in Saharanpur district